Eardwulf or Eardulf is an Anglo-Saxon male name. Notable people with the name include:
 Eardwulf of Northumbria, (floruit late 8th/early 9th century), ruler of Northumbria
 Eardwulf of Kent (floruit middle 8th century), ruler of Kent
 Eardwulf, Bishop of Dunwich (floruit middle 8th century), Bishop of Dunwich
 Eardwulf of Rochester (floruit middle 8th century), Bishop of Rochester
 Eardwulf of Lindisfarne (floruit late 9th century), Bishop of Lindisfarne

See also
 Eadwulf
 Ealdwulf

English masculine given names
Germanic masculine given names